Andreas Kalckhoff (born 18 August 1944 in Saaz, Bohemia) is a German historian and writer.

Early life 
Kalckhoff grew up in Munich, Bavaria.

Education 
Kalckhoff studied Bavarian History, medieval history and politics. In 1976, Kalckhoff was conferred a Ph.D. by Karl Bosl for a thesis on late medieval nationalism in Scotland

Career 
In 1977, Kalckhoff was subeditor of a historical journal until 1978. 
In 1978, Kalckhoff became an assistant professor at the University of Stuttgart in the Institut of Social research, department “Historical Behaviour Studies (Historische Verhaltensforschung)” until 1980.
Kalckhoff is a scholar of August Nitschke.

Personal life 
Since 1980, Kalckhoff lives in Stuttgart working as a free journalist and writer.

Books 
 Kalckhoff, Andreas (1980): Richard III. Sein Leben und seine Zeit.Bergisch-Gladbach: Gustav Lübbe.
 Kalckhoff, Andreas (1983): Nacio Scottorum. Schottischer Regionalismus im Spätmittelalter. Frankfort-on-the-Main; Bern: Peter Lang.
 Kalckhoff, Andreas (1984): Fürsten-, Länder-, Bürgerwappen: Heraldik aus neun Jahrhunderten. Stuttgart: Pro Heraldica.
 Kalckhoff, Andreas (1987): Karl der Große. Verhaltensstruktur eines Herrschers. Munich: Piper.

Sources 
 "Andreas Kalckhoff", in: Gehlen, Rolf & Wolf, Bernd (eds): Der gläserne Zaun. Aufsätze zu Hans Peter Duerrs "Traumzeit". Frankfort-on-the-Main: Syndikat 1983, p. 315.
 "Kalckhoff, Andreas", in Braun, Hugo (ed.): Journalistenkalender 1988/89. Bonn: Ferdinand C. Mentzen 1988, p. 23.
 Kalckhoff, Andreas: Guter Rat, in Oethen, Johannes (ed.): Stuttgarter Lesebuch. Autoren stellen sich vor. Karlsruhe: Braun 1989, pp. 90–96.
 "Kalckhoff, Andreas", in Török, Imre & Grübl, Birgit (eds.): Autoren in Baden-Württemberg. Ein aktuelles Nachschlagewerk. Stuttgart: Silberburg, 1991, pp. 259–260.

References

External links
 Books of Andreas Kalckhoff  in the German National Library
 Homepage kalckhoff.de

1944 births
Living people
20th-century German historians
German Bohemian people
German male non-fiction writers